Mary Kuper "Kay" Papen (born March 19, 1932) is an American politician who served as a member of the New Mexico Senate from January 2001 to January 2021.

Career 
Papen has faced criticism for blocking legislation that would allow voters to consider an amendment that would fund early childhood programs using 1% more yearly from the state's $18 million Land Grant Permanent Fund.

From 2013 to 201, Papen also served as president pro tempore of the New Mexico Senate and has led a coalition of Republicans and conservative Democrats who hold leadership positions in the state Senate, despite the body's 26–16 Democratic majority.

In the 2020 election, Papen faced a primary challenge from Carrie Hamblen, then president of the Las Cruces Green Chamber of Commerce. In the June 2, 2020 Democratic primary, Papen was defeated by Hamblen.

References

External links
 Senator Mary Kay Papen - (D) at the NM Senate website
 Mary Papen - Biography at Project Vote Smart
 Follow the Money – Mary Kay Papen
 2008 2006 2004 2002 2000 campaign contributions

1932 births
21st-century American politicians
21st-century American women politicians
Living people
Democratic Party New Mexico state senators
Politicians from Las Cruces, New Mexico
Women state legislators in New Mexico